Coreoleuciscus is a genus of fish from the cyprinid family endemic to rivers of the Korean peninsula.

Species
There are currently 2 recognized species in this genus:
 Coreoleuciscus aeruginos H. Y. Song & I. C. Bang, 2015 
 Coreoleuciscus splendidus T. Mori, 1935 (Korean splendid dace)

References

 
Fish of Korea
Fish of East Asia
Ray-finned fish genera
Taxa named by Tamezo Mori